HMCS Skeena was a River-class destroyer that served in the Royal Canadian Navy (RCN) from 1931 to 1944. She was similar to the Royal Navy's A class and wore initially the pennant D59, changed in 1940 to I59.

She was built by John I. Thornycroft & Company at Woolston, Hampshire and commissioned into the RCN on 10 June 1931 at Portsmouth, England. Skeena and her sister  were the first ships specifically built for the Royal Canadian Navy. She arrived in Halifax, Nova Scotia on 3 July 1931.

Second World War

Skeena was assigned to North Atlantic convoy Escort Group C-3 escorting convoys ON 93, HX 191, ONS 104, SC 90, ON 115, HX 202, ON 121, SC 98, ON 131, HX 210, ON 141, SC 109, ONS 152 prior to refit in January 1943.

Trans-Atlantic convoys escorted

Grounding
Skeena was lost in a storm on the night of 24 October 1944.  She was anchored off Reykjavík, Iceland and dragged her anchor and grounded in  waves off Viðey Island with the loss of 15 crewmembers.

Her hulk was paid off and sold to Iceland interests in June 1945; she was then raised and broken up. Her propeller was salvaged and used in a memorial near the Viðey Island ferry terminal.

Notes

References

External links

Canadian River-class destroyers
Canadian River-class destroyers converted from A-class destroyers (1929)
Ships built in Southampton
1930 ships
World War II destroyers of Canada
Maritime incidents in October 1944
World War II shipwrecks in the Atlantic Ocean
Ships built by John I. Thornycroft & Company